The National Trade Union Promyana is a trade union centre in Bulgaria.

It is affiliated with the International Trade Union Confederation.

References

External links
www.promyana-bg.org

Trade unions in Bulgaria
International Trade Union Confederation